The U.S. state of Wyoming first required its residents to register their motor vehicles and display license plates in 1913. , plates are issued and regulated by the Wyoming Department of Transportation through its Motor Vehicle Services division.

Wyoming license plates have included an image of a Bucking Horse and Rider since 1936.

Wyoming state law usually requires front and rear license plates. However, on July 1, 2015, a new law took effect that allowed custom and antique vehicles to display only rear plates, as well as vehicles that were originally manufactured without a plate bracket on the front.

Passenger baseplates

1913 to 1974
The 1955 (dated 1956) issue was the first Wyoming license plate that complied with these standards.

No slogans were used on passenger plates during the period covered by this subsection.

1975 to present

Non-passenger plates

First issued in 2008.

Previous non-passenger plates

Specialty plates

First issued in 2017 (except for the Wildlife Conservation plate).

County codes

References

External links
Wyoming license plates, 1969–present

Wyoming
Transportation in Wyoming
Wyoming transportation-related lists